Fabrice Apruzesse (born 8 May 1985 in Marseille, Bouches-du-Rhône) is a French professional footballer who plays as a forward.

References

External links

1985 births
Living people
Footballers from Marseille
Athlético Marseille players
Olympique de Marseille players
Aubagne FC players
US Marseille Endoume players
Ligue 1 players
Championnat National 2 players
Championnat National 3 players
Association football forwards
French footballers